Mao Anlong was born as the third son of Mao Zedong in 1927 and died in 1931 at the age of 3 or 4. He was the youngest child of Yang Kaihui to die.

Early life
Mao Anlong was born in 1927 in Hunan to Mao Zedong and Yang Kaihui, Mao's second wife. He had two older brothers, Mao Anying and Mao Anqing. When he was very young his father, Mao Zedong, left the family for his next wife, He Zizhen. Later, his mother was executed by a warlord, leaving Anlong and his siblings effectively orphaned. Upon being smuggled  to Shanghai after his mother's execution, he and his siblings lived on the streets. Mao died from dysentery at the age of 3 or 4.

Family
His mother was Yang Kaihui; his father was Mao Zedong and his older brothers were Mao Anying, who died in 1950 and Mao Anqing, who died in 2007. His half siblings include Yang Yuehua, Li Min, and Li Na.

Imposter 
In the early 1990s, a flood of unapproved biographies of revolutionary leaders appeared. One such "autobiography" was a supposed account by Mao Anlong of how he had not died and actually been forced into hiding by his father. This book was denounced by Mao Anqing.

References

1927 births
1931 deaths
Children of national leaders of China
Mao Zedong family
Deaths from dysentery

Child deaths